Kabongo Kasongo (born 18 July 1994) is a DR Congolese professional footballer who plays for Turkish club Sakaryaspor.

Club career
On 13 June 2017, he moved from Al Ittihad to Zamalek for a fee of $830,000.

In July 2016, Kasongo had a short trial at Saint-Étienne, but they didn't give him a contract and his Visa in France expired, forcing him to join Al Ittihad one month later.

International career
He made his debut for Democratic Republic of the Congo national football team on 18 November 2018 in an African Cup of Nations qualifier against Congo and scored a goal on his debut in a 1–1 draw.

International goals
Scores and results list DR Congo's goal tally first.

Honours
Zamalek
 Egypt Cup: 2017–18
Egyptian Super Cup: 2019–20
 Saudi-Egyptian Super Cup: 2018
 CAF Confederation Cup: 2018–19
 CAF Super Cup: 2020

References

External links 

1994 births
Footballers from Kinshasa
21st-century Democratic Republic of the Congo people
Living people
Democratic Republic of the Congo footballers
Democratic Republic of the Congo international footballers
Association football forwards
AS Kaloum Star players
Al Ittihad Alexandria Club players
Zamalek SC players
Al-Wehda Club (Mecca) players
Wydad AC players
Boluspor footballers
Sakaryaspor footballers
Egyptian Premier League players
Saudi Professional League players
TFF First League players
Democratic Republic of the Congo expatriate footballers
Expatriate footballers in Guinea
Democratic Republic of the Congo expatriate sportspeople in Guinea
Expatriate footballers in Egypt
Democratic Republic of the Congo expatriate sportspeople in Egypt
Expatriate footballers in Saudi Arabia
Democratic Republic of the Congo expatriate sportspeople in Saudi Arabia
Expatriate footballers in Morocco
Democratic Republic of the Congo expatriate sportspeople in Morocco
Expatriate footballers in Turkey
Democratic Republic of the Congo expatriate sportspeople in Turkey